IFK Kalix is a Swedish football club located in Kalix in Norrbotten County.

Background
IFK Kalix currently plays in Division 3 Norra Norrland which is the fifth tier of Swedish football. They play their home matches at the Furuvallen in Kalix.

The club is affiliated to Norrbottens Fotbollförbund. IFK Kalix won the Midnattsolscupen (Midnight Sun Cup) in 1998.

The club used to have a bandy department, but this was untied from the club in 1990, combined with Nyborgs SK to form Kalix BF. Kalix BF is now (2014) playing in Elitserien, the top-tier of Swedish bandy.

Season to season

Attendances

In recent seasons IFK Kalix have had the following average attendances:

Footnotes

External links
 IFK Kalix – Official website

Sport in Norrbotten County
Football clubs in Norrbotten County
Association football clubs established in 1921
Bandy clubs established in 1921
Defunct bandy clubs in Sweden
Kalix
IFK Kalix